The Ministry of Women or Ministry of Women's Affairs  (MWA) is a Paraguayan state ministry established in 2012. The current Minister of Women is Celina Esther Lezcano, who succeeded Nilda Romero in March 2021.

History of the Ministry
In 1993 the Paraguayan state created a Secretariat for Women's Affairs within the Office of the President. This secretariat was raised to the status of a Ministry of Women's Affairs by Act No. 4675, in 2012.

In 2013 the Ministry took action to address high rates of domestic violence, promoting a national 24-hour telephone hotline for victims and operating a shelter in Asunción for female victims of sex trafficking or domestic violence. The Ministry is participating in the National Commission on Climate Change, which is preparing a National Gender Strategy on Climate Change to advance women's rights in relation to the environment. In 2018 Presidential Decree no. 936 established a National Equality Plan, setting out 2018-2024 plans for the Ministry of Women to work towards gender equality in partnership with UN Women.

List of Ministers of Women

Secretaries for Women's Affairs (1993–2013)
 Cristina Muñoz (1993–??)
 Nilda Cabrera (1997–1998)
 Haydee Carnagnola de Aquino (1998–1999)
 María José Argaña de Mateu (2003–2008)
 Gloria Rubin (2008–2013)

Ministers of Women (2013 to present)
 Ana María Baiardi (14 August 2013 – 15 August 2018)
 Nilda Romero (15 August 2018 – 6 March 2021)
 Celina Esther Lezcano (9 March 2021  – present)

References

External links
 Official website

Women's ministries
Government of Paraguay
2012 establishments in Paraguay
Women in Paraguay
Women's rights in Paraguay